The Division of Gippsland is an Australian electoral division in the state of Victoria. The division was proclaimed in 1900, and was one of the original 65 divisions to be contested at the first federal election. It is named for the Gippsland region of eastern Victoria, which in turn is named for Sir George Gipps, Governor of New South Wales 1838–1846. It includes the towns of Bairnsdale, Morwell, Sale and Traralgon.

Geography
Since 1984, federal electoral division boundaries in Australia have been determined at redistributions by a redistribution committee appointed by the Australian Electoral Commission. Redistributions occur for the boundaries of divisions in a particular state, and they occur every seven years, or sooner if a state's representation entitlement changes or when divisions of a state are malapportioned.

History
It is one of two original divisions in Victoria to have never elected a Labor-endorsed member, the other being Kooyong. It has been held by the National Party and its predecessor, the Country Party, since 1922: it is the only seat the party has held continuously since its creation. On its new boundaries, however, it takes in most of the industrial Latrobe Valley.

Prominent former members include Allan McLean, a former Premier of Victoria who served as a minister under George Reid; and Peter Nixon, a senior minister in the Coalition governments from Harold Holt to Malcolm Fraser.

Then-sitting MP Peter McGauran announced his resignation in April 2008, sparking a June 2008 by-election, with the three major parties all contesting the election. The Nationals retained the seat on an increased margin, electing Darren Chester.

Members

Election results

References

External links
 Division of Gippsland – Australian Electoral Commission

Electoral divisions of Australia
Constituencies established in 1901
1901 establishments in Australia
Gippsland (region)
Bairnsdale
Traralgon
Sale, Victoria
Shire of Wellington
Shire of East Gippsland